Violence in a Women's Prison is a women in prison film directed by Bruno Mattei. The film stars Laura Gemser and  Gabriele Tinti. It tells the story of Emanuelle, who is sent to Santa Catarina Women's Penitentiary for drugs and prostitution, where she meets the warden  and the other inmates. Her actual reason is undercover reporting for Amnesty International. It is the seventh film in the Emanuelle nera film series and the first one directed by Mattei.

Plot
Under a false identity, journalist Emanuelle (Laura Gemser) pretends to be a drug dealer to get herself sent to prison in order to investigate and document the brutality and abuses that inmates are subjected to. While there she is attacked, locked in solitary confinement, and injured. Emanuelle is helped by Dr. Moran (Gabriele Tinti) and some prisoners, and is able to report her findings, after which the perpetrators are arrested.

Cast
 Laura Gemser as Emanuelle / Laura Kendall 
 Gabriele Tinti as Dr. Moran 
 Maria Romano as Kitty 
 Ursula Flores as Consuelo 
 Antonella Giacomini as Malone 
 Franco Caracciolo as Leander 
 Françoise Perrot as Hertha 
 Lorraine De Selle as Head Warden 
 Jacques Stany as Chief Inspector 
 Leila Durante as Pilar
 Franca Stoppi as Rescaut
 Raul Cabrera as Miguel

Production
Violence in a Women's Prison was directed by Bruno Mattei who is credited as Vincent Dawn or Gilbert Roussel in some prints.

Release
Violence in a Women's Prison was released in 1982. It was released as Caged Women in the United States in April 1984. The film also has the alternative title Women's Penitentiary 4.

Critical response
Allmovie gave the film a rating of one star out of five, noting that "Mattei doesn't skimp on the nastiness, presenting a three-way catfight on a floor full of feces, Gemser nibbled by rats in solitary confinement, a homosexual who is sodomized to death after his straight cellmates are aroused by a striptease, and various rapes, tortures, and vomit scenes."

Home media
The DVD was first released by Shriek Show for Region 1 in December 2002. The all-region Blu-ray was released by Severin Films in May 2018.

References

Parenthetical sources

External links
 
 

1980s exploitation films
1980s prison films
Lesbian-related films
Italian sexploitation films
Women in prison films
Emanuelle
Films directed by Bruno Mattei
Films scored by Luigi Ceccarelli
1980s Italian films
1980s French films